Bibimbap (from Korean  , literally "mixed rice"), sometimes romanized as bi bim bap or bi bim bop, is a Korean rice dish.

The term bibim means "mixing" and bap is cooked rice. It is served as a bowl of warm white rice topped with namul (sautéed and seasoned vegetables) or kimchi (traditional fermented vegetables) and gochujang (chili pepper paste), soy sauce, or doenjang (a fermented soybean paste). Egg and sliced meat (usually beef) are common additions, stirred together thoroughly just before eating.

In South Korea, Jeonju, Jinju, and Tongyeong are especially famous for their versions of bibimbap. In 2011, the dish was listed at number 40 on the World's 50 most delicious foods readers' poll compiled by CNN Travel.

Etymologies 
The origin of the many names of bibimbap come from Korea's hanja based records, originally appearing in  Yeokjogumun of Gijaejapgi by Bak Dongnyang in the end of 16th century (around 1590). This record associated the original bibimbap as "hondonban" This later went on to become beubwieumbap nearly 200 years after the hanja record, and was documented in a Hangul record. The hanja dictionary indeed contained "bubwida" or "bubwium, Dong" in hanja, which meant "mix" or "" in Korean.

History 
The exact origin of bibimbap is unknown. People could have started mixing bap (rice) with banchan (side dishes) after the outdoor jesa (rites), such as sansinje (rite for mountain gods) or dongsinje (rite for village gods), where they needed to "eat with the god" but did not have as many cooking pots and items of crockery to hand as they would normally have at home. Jeonju Bibimbap is an old-fashioned and delicious dish. Some scholars assert that bibimbap originates from the traditional practice of mixing all the food offerings made at an jesa (ancestral rite) in a bowl before partaking of it.

Ordinary people ate bibimbap on the eve of the lunar new year as the people at that time felt that they had to get rid of all of the leftover side dishes before the new year. The solution to this problem was to put all of the leftovers in a bowl of rice and to mix them together. Farmers ate bibimbap during farming season as it was the easiest way to make food for a large number of people. Bibimbap was served to the king, usually as a lunch or a between-meal snack. There was more than vegetables in this bibimbap.

Bibimbap was recorded as hondon-ban in the history book Historical notes of Gijae by the Joseon scholar Bak Dong-ryang (1569–1635). In the Diary of Cheongdae by another Joseon scholar Gwon Sang-il (1679–1760), it was recorded as goldong-ban. The dish was also recorded in Complete Works of Seongho by Yi Ik (1681–1764) as goldong, in Complete Works of Cheongjanggwan by Yi deok-mu (1741–1793) as goldong-ban, and in Works of Nakhasaeng by Yi Hak-gyu (1770–1835) as both goldong-ban and goldong.

In Collected Works of Oju written by Yi Gyu-gyeong (1788–1856), recorded varieties of bibimbap, such as vegetable bibimbap, miscellany bibimbap, hoe bibimbap, shad bibimbap, prawn bibimbap, salted shrimp bibimbap, shrimp roe bibimbap, marinated crab bibimbap, wild chive bibimbap, fresh cucumber bibimbap, gim flake bibimbap, gochujang bibimbap, soybean sprout bibimbap, and also stated that bibimbap was a local specialty of Pyongyang, along with naengmyeon and gamhongno.

The first known recipe for bibimbap is found in the Siuijeonseo, an anonymous cookbook from the late 19th century.

The late 20th century brought about the globalization of the Korean culture, traditions, and food to many areas of the world with many restaurant chains being opened up in various international airports that encourage the sale of bibimbap.

Culture 
Bibimbap is an extensively customizable food with a variety of ingredients that can be used in its creation. It has existed in Korea for centuries and even has a place in society today. It came from early rural Koreans taking leftover vegetables, sometimes having meat, with rice and mixing them in a bowl. This was cheap and did not require all of the time and space of a traditional meal.

Bibimbap was originally written in hanja due to the ancient use of the Chinese characters in Korea. There are two separate ancient writings that suggest the original reasoning behind the creation and use of bibimbap. The first one, "People's Unofficial Story of Jeonju", tells of Jeonju bibimbap being used in occasions such as parties that included government officials of provincial offices. The second being, "Lannokgi", which told of bibimbap being made by the wives, of farmers, who had no time to prepare meals the traditional way with many side dishes, and instead they were able to throw most of the ingredients in a bowl sometimes adding whatever they happened to be cultivating.  Although bibimbap was originally rarely mentioned and mostly only in hanja records, it began to be more frequently referenced and in Hangul (Korean alphabets) records as well upon the creation of Hangul by the King Sejong the Great to improve the state's literacy.

The division of Korea in the 20th century caused a cultural divide in the creation of bibimbap with two types related to both North and South Korea. The most famous regions for traditional bibimbap happen to be Pyongyang for its vegetable bibimbap in the North and Jeonju for its Jeonju bibimbap.

In the late 20th century, bibimbap started to become widespread in many countries in the West, due to its simplicity, cheap cost, and delicious taste. Many airlines connecting to South Korea via Incheon International Airport began to serve it, and it was accepted more globally as a popular Korean dish. Bibimbap has also been described as a symbol of the Korean culture to non-Koreans due to Korea becoming more acceptable to foreigners and multicultural traditions.

Preparation 

Bibimbap can be various kinds of bibimbap depending on the ingredients. Vegetables commonly used in bibimbap include julienned oi (cucumber), aehobak (courgette), mu (radish), mushrooms, doraji (bellflower root), and gim, as well as spinach, soybean sprouts, and gosari (bracken fern stems). Dubu (tofu), either plain or sautéed, or a leaf of lettuce may be added, or chicken or seafood may be substituted for beef. For visual appeal, the vegetables are often placed so adjacent colors complement each other. In the South Korean version, sesame oil, red pepper paste (gochujang), and sesame seeds are added.

Variations

Jeonju 
Jeonju is a South Korean province known for its long standing food preparation style, which has been praised and passed down throughout thousands of years. Jeonju is the most famous place for Bibimbap. Jeonju bibimbap along with kongnamul-gukbap (bean sprout and rice soup) are signature dishes of Jeonju. Jeonju bibimbap is one of the most popular dishes in Korea and around the world. It is usually topped with quality Jeonju soy bean sprouts, hwangpo-muk, gochujang, jeopjang, and seasoned raw beef and served with kongnamul-gukbap. The rice of Jeonju bibimbap is specially prepared by being cooked in beef shank broth for flavor and finished with sesame oil for flavor and nutrients. Jeonju Bibimbap Festival is also held every year.

Hot stone pot (dolsot) 
Hot stone pot bibimbap (dolsot-bibimbap) is a variation of bibimbap served in a very hot dolsot (stone pot) in which a raw egg is cooked against the sides of the bowl. The bowl is so hot that anything that touches it sizzles for minutes. Before the rice is placed in the bowl, the bottom of the bowl is coated with sesame oil, making the layer of the rice touching the bowl cook to a crisp, golden brown known as nurungji. This variation of bibimbap is typically served to order, with the egg and other ingredients mixed in the pot just prior to consumption.

Yakcho 
Yakcho-bibimbap is from Jecheon. Yak (약) is a historical term for medicinal. Jecheon is a great place for medicinal herbs to grow. People could get a thicker root and more medicinal herb than other areas. The combination of the medicinal herbs and popular bibimbap made it one of the most popular foods in Jecheon.

Hoedeopbap 
Hoedeopbap is a bibimbap with a variety of raw seafood, such as tilapia, salmon, tuna or sometimes octopus, but each bowl of rice usually contains only one variety of seafood. The term hoe in the word means raw fish. The dish is popular along the coasts of Korea where fish are abundant.

Other 
 Beef tartare (yukhoe)
 Freshwater snail soybean paste (ureong-doenjang)
Roe (albap)
 Spicy pork (jeyuk)
 Sprout (saessak)
 Tongyeong, served with seafood
 Wild vegetabler (sanchae)
 Wild herb
 Brass bowl

Symbolism 
Bibimbap ingredients are rich in symbolism. Black or dark colours represent north and the kidneys – for instance, shiitake mushrooms, bracken ferns or nori seaweed. Red or orange represents south and the heart, with chilli, carrots, and jujube dates. Green represents east and the liver, with cucumber and spinach. White is west or the lungs, with foods such as bean sprouts, radish, and rice. Yellow represents the centre, or stomach. Foods include pumpkin, potato or egg.

See also 

 Korean cuisine
 Bulgogi
 Gochujang
 Heotjesabap
 Kimchi
 Nurungji
 Claypot rice
 Nasi campur, a Southeast Asian dish with a similar meaning

References

External links 

Bibimbap – Korea Tourism Organization
Bibimbap Recipe – Korea Tourism Organization

Rice dishes
Korean cuisine